Moroto District is a district in the Northern Region of Uganda. The town of Moroto is the site of the district headquarters.

Location
Moroto District is bordered by Kaabong District to the north, Kenya to the east, Amudat District to the south, Nakapiripirit District to the southwest, Napak District to the west, and Kotido District to the northwest. Moroto Town, where the district headquarters, is at the foot of Mt. Moroto.

Overview
Moroto District is part of the larger Karamoja sub-region. Moroto District is "characterized by rocky mountainous landscape with
moderately low rainfall".

It is composed of three counties: Bokora County, Matheniko County, and Moroto Municipality. It is inhabited by the Karimojong, a distinctive ethnic group that highly cherishes its traditions.

The district is a hub of mineral resources that are yet to be optimally exploited. There are over fifty different minerals and precious stones in the Karamoja region. Of these, Moroto has gold, silver, copper, iron, titanium, manganese, niobium, tantalite, and chrome. Other proven minerals include marble, mica, garnets, limestone, and asbestos.

Population
In 1991, the national census enumerated the district population at 59,149. The 2002 national census enumerated the population at 77,243. In August 2014, the national census and household survey enumerated the population at 103,432.

References

External links
 Profile of Moroto District

 
Karamoja
Districts of Uganda
Northern Region, Uganda